Alexander von Schlippenbach (born 7 April 1938) is a German jazz pianist and composer. He came to prominence in the 1960s playing free jazz in a trio with saxophonist Evan Parker and drummer Paul Lovens, and as a member of the Globe Unity Orchestra. Since the 1980s, Von Schlippenbach has explored the work of more traditional jazz composers such as Jelly Roll Morton or Thelonious Monk.

Biography
Schlippenbach started to play piano from the age of eight and went on to study composition at Cologne under Bernd Alois Zimmermann. While studying he started to play with Manfred Schoof. At the age of 28 he founded the Globe Unity Orchestra. In 1988, he founded the Berlin Contemporary Jazz Orchestra, a big band that has over the years comprised, among others, Willem Breuker, Paul Lovens, Misha Mengelberg, Evan Parker, Schlippenbach's wife Aki Takase and Kenny Wheeler.

In 1994, he was awarded the Albert Mangelsdorff prize.

Schlippenbach has produced various recordings and worked for German radio channels. He played with many players of the European free jazz community. In 2005, he recorded the complete works of Thelonious Monk, which were released on CD as Monk's Casino.

Gallery

Discography

As leader
 Globe Unity (SABA, 1967)
 The Living Music (QUASAR, 1969)
 Payan (Enja, 1972)
 Pakistani Pomade (FMP, 1973)
 Three Nails Left (FMP, 1975)
 The Hidden Peak (FMP, 1977)
 Piano Solo (FMP, 1977)
 Rondo Brillante with Martin Theurer (FMP, 1983)
 Anticlockwise (FMP, 1983)
 Stranger Than Love with Paul Lovens,  (Po Torch, 1985)
 Smoke with Sunny Murray,  (FMP, 1990)
 Elf Bagatellen (FMP, 1990)
 Physics (FMP, 1993)
 Light Blue Schlippenbach Plays Monk (Enja, 1997)
 Tangens with Sam Rivers (FMP, 1998)
 Digger's Harvest with Tony Oxley (FMP, 1999)
 Complete Combustion (FMP, 1999)
 Hunting the Snake (Atavistic, 2000)
 Swinging the Bim (FMP, 2000)
 Compression (2002)
 Broomriding (Psi, 2003)
 Open Speech with Carlos Bechegas (Forward, 2004)
  Vesuvius with Paul Dunmall (Slam, 2005)
 Monk's Casino (Intakt, 2005)
 Winterreise (Psi, 2006)
 Twelve Tone Tales Vol. I (Intakt, 2006)
 Twelve Tone Tales Vol. II (Intakt, 2006)
 Dedalus with Daniele D'Agaro (Artesuono, 2007)
 Friulian Sketches (psi, 2008)
 Blackheath with Eddie Prevost (Matchless, 2008)
 Gold Is Where You Find It (Intakt, 2008)
 Bauhaus Dessau (Intakt, 2010)
 Berlin with G9 Gipfel (Jazzwerkstatt, 2010)
 Blue Hawk with Manfred Schoof (Jazzwerkstatt, 2011)
 Schlippenbach Plays Monk (Intakt, 2012)
 First Recordings (Trost, 2014)
 Features (Intakt, 2015)
 Warsaw Concert (Intakt, 2016)
 Jazz Now! (Intuition, 2016)
 So Far with Rudi Mahall (Relative Pitch, 2018)
 Interweaving with Dag Magnus Narvesen (Not Two, 2018)
 Liminal Field with Dag Magnus Narvesen  (Not Two, 2019)

With Globe Unity Orchestra
 Live in Wuppertal (FMP, 1973)
 Der Alte Mann Bricht...Sein Schweigen (FMP, 1974)
 Bavarian Calypso & Good Bye (FMP, 1975)
 Into the Valley Vol. 2 (FMP, 1976)
 Evidence Vol. 1 (FMP, 1976)
 Jahrmarkt & Local Fair (Po Torch, 1977)
 Pearls (FMP, 1977)
 Improvisations (Japo, 1978)
 Hamburg '74 (FMP, 1979)
 Compositions (Japo, 1980)
 Intergalactic Blow (Japo, 1983)
 Rumbling (FMP, 1991)
 20th Anniversary (FMP, 1993)
 Globe Unity 67 & 70 (Atavistic, 2001)
 Globe Unity 2002 (Intakt, 2003)
 Baden-Baden '75 (FMP, 2011)
 Globe Unity 40 Years (Intakt, 2007)
 Globe Unity 50 Years (Intakt, 2018)

With Sven-Ake Johansson 
 Live at the Quartier Latin (FMP, 1976)
 Kung Bore (FMP, 1978)
 Drive (FMP, 1981)
 Kalfaktor A. Falke Und Andere Lieder (FMP, 1983)
 Blind Aber Hungrig Norddeutsche Gesange (FMP, 1986)

With Manfred Schoof
 Voices (CBS, 1966)
 Manfred Schoof Sextet (Wergo, 1967)
 European Echoes (FMP, 1969)
 The Early Quintet (FMP, 1978)

With Aki Takase
 Piano Duets: Live in Berlin 93/94 (FMP, 1995)
 Live at Café Amores (NoBusiness, 1995)
 Lok 03 (Leo, 2005)
 Iron Wedding: Piano Duets (Intakt, 2008)
 New Blues (Yellowbird, 2012)
 So Long Eric! (Intakt, 2014)
 Signals (Trost, 2016)
 Live at Cafe Amores (NoBusiness, 2018)
 Hokusai Piano Solo (Intakt, 2019)

With the Berlin Contemporary Jazz Orchestra
 Berlin Contemporary Jazz Orchestra (ECM, 1990)
 The Morlocks and Other Pieces (FMP, 1994)
 Live in Japan '96 (DIW, 1997)

As sideman
With Peter Brotzmann
 Alarm (FMP, 1983)
 Up and Down (Olof Bright 2010)
 Peter Brotzmann/Alexander von Schlippenbach/Achim Trampenau (Carbon Edition, 2013)
  Fifty Years After (Trost, 2019)

With Evan Parker
 50th Birthday Concert (Leo, 1994)
 2X3=5 (Leo 2001)
 The Bishop's Move (Les Disques Victo, 2004)
 America 2003 (Psi, 2004)

With others
 Gunter Hampel, Heartplants (SABA, 1965)
 Gunter Hampel, Legendary (Birth 1998)
 Mario Schiano, Unlike (Splasc(H), 1990)
 Philipp Wachsmann, Free Zone Appleby, 2006 (Psi, 2007)
 Bernd Alois Zimmermann, Die Befristeten & Improvisationen Uber Die Oper Die Soldaten & Tratto (Wergo, 1967)
 Bernd Alois Zimmermann, Requiem fur Einen Jungen Dichter (Sony 1995)

See also
 FMP (Free Music Production)
 Jazz in Germany

References

External links
 Official website
 FMP releases
 allboutjazz.com
 
 Biography and discography at the European Free Improvisation Pages

Free jazz pianists
Experimental big band musicians
German jazz pianists
German jazz composers
Male jazz composers
1938 births
Living people
Musicians from Berlin
Avant-garde jazz pianists
Recipients of the Cross of the Order of Merit of the Federal Republic of Germany
German male pianists
21st-century pianists
20th-century pianists
20th-century German male musicians
21st-century German male musicians
Berlin Contemporary Jazz Orchestra members
Globe Unity Orchestra members
Atavistic Records artists
FMP/Free Music Production artists
Intakt Records artists
NoBusiness Records artists